The Cork Premier Junior Hurling Championship (known for sponsorship reasons as the Co-Op Superstores Cork Premier Junior Hurling Championship and abbreviated to the Cork PJHC) is an annual hurling competition organised by the Cork County Board of the Gaelic Athletic Association and contested by the top-ranking junior clubs in the county of Cork in Ireland. It is the fifth tier overall in the entire Cork hurling championship system.

The Cork Premier Junior Championship was introduced in 2022 following a restructuring of the various intermediate and junior championships.

In its current format, the Cork Premier Junior Championship begins in mid-summer. The 12 participating club teams are into three groups of four teams and play each other in a round-robin system. The three group winners and the three runners-up proceed to the knockout phase that culminates with the final match at Páirc Uí Rinn. The winner of the Cork Premier Junior Championship qualifies for the subsequent Munster Club Championship.

Ballygiblin are the title holders after defeating Tracton by 2-19 to 1-12 in the 2022 final.

History
In March 2019, Cork County Board delegates voted on the restructuring of the entire Cork hurling championship system following an extensive review process. The plan hoped to reduce the number of teams in the top four tiers to 48, a move which required a restructuring of the intermediate and junior grades. The result was the creation of the Cork Lower Intermediate Hurling Championship, a two-year temporary championship which would result in several teams being regraded to Junior and the championship being eventually discontinued. In February 2022, the County Board took a further vote on the future of the club junior and intermediate championships. Delegates voted in favour of Option B which saw the Lower Intermediate Championship being rebranded as the Premier Junior Championship.

Format

Group stage
The 12 teams are divided into three groups of four. Over the course of the group stage, each team plays once against the others in the group, resulting in each team being guaranteed at least three games. Two points are awarded for a win, one for a draw and zero for a loss. The teams are ranked in the group stage table by points gained, then scoring difference and then their head-to-head record. The top two teams in each group qualify for the knockout stage.

Knockout stage
Quarter-finals: Two lone quarter-finals featuring the four lowest-placed qualifying teams from the group stage. Two teams qualify for the next round.

Semi-finals: The two quarter-final winners and the top two highest-placed qualifying teams from the group stage contest this round. The two winners from these games advance to the final.

Final: The two semi-final winners contest the final. The winning team are declared champions.

Promotion and relegation
At the end of the championship, the winning team was automatically promoted to the Cork Intermediate A Championship for the following season. The two worst-ranked teams from the group stage took part in a playoff, with the losing team being relegated to the Cork Junior A Championship.

2023 Teams

Sponsorship
Co-Op Superstores were unveiled as the title sponsor for all of Cork GAA's hurling championships in July 2020.

Qualification for subsequent competitions
The Cork Premier Junior Championship winners qualify for the subsequent Munster Junior Club Hurling Championship.

Trophy and medals
The Jimmy O'Mahony Cup is the current prize for winning the championship. It was commissioned to honour Jimmy O'Mahony who served as secretary of the Newcestown club from 1967 until his death in September 2020. 

In accordance with GAA rules, the County Board awards a set of gold medals to the championship winners. The medals depict a stylised version of the Cork GAA crest.

Roll of Honour

By Division

List of finals

References

 
1
Junior hurling county championships